WCON-FM (99.3 MHz) is a radio station broadcasting a classic country format. Licensed to Cornelia, Georgia, United States, the station is currently owned by Habersham Broadcasting Co. WCON-FM also broadcasts Atlanta Braves baseball games.

Its tower is located in White County, and its studios are located at 540 North Main Street in Cornelia.

History
WCON-FM went on the air in 1965 as a Class A station and was upgraded to a C2 class radio station with 50,000 watts of power in 1989. On December 5, 2015, WCON increased its power to 100,000 watts, covering all of Northeast Georgia and portions of the Carolinas.

In May 2019, the station flipped from a blend of country and southern gospel music to classic country as My Country 99.3.

References

External links

CON-FM
Radio stations established in 1965
Classic country radio stations in the United States